Rhene pinguis is a species of jumping spider  in the genus Rhene that was identified in South Africa. The male was first described in 2009 and the female in 2018. The spider is flat and hairy, its swollen look giving rise to its species name.

Taxonomy
Rhene pinguis is a member of the genus Rhene, which is named after the Greek female name, shared by mythological figures. The species name, pinguis, means fat or thick, and relates to the swollen look of the spider.

Description
The spider was first identified in 2009, with initially only the male described. The female was first described in 2018. The spider is flat, hairy and brown in colour. The male is distinguished by its the wide vane at the tip of the embolus. The female is similar to the related Rhene formosa, but differs in the design of its copulatory opening. The species are similar in size, the female being marginally larger.

Distribution
Rhene pinguis has only been identified in South Africa. It is restricted to the Ndumo Game Reserve in KwaZulu-Natal.

See also
Drawings of Rhene pinguis

References

Endemic fauna of South Africa
Salticidae
Spiders of South Africa
Spiders described in 2009
Taxa named by Wanda Wesołowska